Ute Wetzig (born April 11, 1971, in Halle an der Saale, Sachsen-Anhalt) is a female diver from Germany, who won a gold, a silver and a bronze medal in the women's 10 m platform event at the European Championships in the early 1990s.

Wetzig competed for her native country in three consecutive Summer Olympics, starting in 1992 (Barcelona, Spain). She was affiliated with the BSV AOK Leipzig during her career.

References
sports-reference

1971 births
Living people
German female divers
Divers at the 1992 Summer Olympics
Divers at the 1996 Summer Olympics
Divers at the 2000 Summer Olympics
Olympic divers of Germany
20th-century German women
21st-century German women